Crocothemis nigrifrons is a species of dragonfly in the family Libellulidae. 
Its common names include black-headed skimmer and blue-scarlet dragonfly. It is found in Australia, Papua New Guinea, and the Solomon Islands.

The male is blue and black, and the female is yellow to brown in color.

The species is usually found near still or sluggish waters and is common over much of its range.

Gallery

See also
 List of Odonata species of Australia

References

 Watson, Theischinger, and Abbey (1991). The Australian Dragonflies. CSIRO, Canberra and Melbourne.

Libellulidae
Odonata of Australia
Odonata of Oceania
Insects of Australia
Insects of New Guinea
Taxa named by William Forsell Kirby
Insects described in 1868